3 Gante 30 dina 30 seconds ( 3 hours 30 days 30 seconds) is a Kannada-language romance film written and directed by G K Madhusudhan and produced by Chandrashekar R Padmashali under the banner Brain Share Creations Pvt Ltd. The film stars newcomers Arun Gowda & Kavya Shetty in lead roles along with Devaraj, Sudharani, Edakallu Guddada Mele Chandrashekhar, Ramesh Bhat, Anantavelu, T.S.Nagabharana and Gururaj Hosakote. It was released on 19 January 2018 across Karnataka.

Plot

The film is a sensitive poetry of love. The story is a task in between two youngsters, which gives an accidental twist to their life. Avinash, a jovial boy,  professionally an advocate and Sharmila, a young and matured daughter of a well known media proprietor, who is an investigative journalist on corruption.

Cast
Arun Gowda	as Avinash
Kavya Shetty as Sharmila		
Devaraj	
Sudha Rani
Ramesh Bhat	
T. S. Nagabharana	
Gururaj Hosakote

Soundtrack

Composer V. Sridhar has scored the music. He has composed six songs in which acclaimed poet Jayant Kaykini, director G K Madhusudhan and Sukanya Gautam have penned down the lyrics.

Release

Critical reception

Sunayana Suresh of The Times of India  gave the film a rating of 2/5 and wrote "If you are the old-school romantic, who believes that love stories need a lot of sentiments, a little action and the heroine transforming into being just the man's prop, this might be for you". A Sharadhaa, reviewing for The New Indian Express, said "In this slow-paced film, Aru Gowda looks diminished. He needs to work on his screen presence in his forthcoming projects. Kavya Shetty has put in an effort but can do better over time. The rest of the cast, including Chandrashekar, Devaraj and Sudha Rani, do well individually but fail as a supporting cast.
Melodies by Sridhar V Sambram are placed at the right points, but they do not save the film". Shyam Prasad S  reviewing for Bangalore Mirror  rated the film 1.5 out of 5 stars, and wrote "It is an ordinary film made worse by its overconfidence".

References

External links

2010s Kannada-language films
2018 romance films
Indian romance films
2018 masala films
Films scored by Sridhar V. Sambhram